John William Robinson Parker  (6 October 1857 – 24 February 1938) was a British soldier, antiquarian, owner of Browsholme Hall and Honorary Bowbearer of the Forest of Bowland, Lancashire.

Life 
Parker was the second son of Thomas Goulbourne Parker (1818–79) of Browsholme and Newton in Yorkshire and Alkincoats and Colne in Lancashire, and his wife Mary Ann Parker (1824–88) the eldest daughter and co-heiress of John Francis Carr (1786–1862) of Carr Lodge, Horbury, Yorkshire. He was a cousin of the antiquarian Thomas Lister Parker.

Parker's succeeded his elder brother,  Edward Parker (1846–94), as owner of Browsholme Hall and Honorary Bowbearer of the Forest of Bowland, Lancashire,  in 1894. Parker joined the 5th Lancashire Militia in 1876. He was later supreme commander of the 800 men of the 3rd Battalion of the East Lancashire Regiment serving in the Second Boer War in South Africa. He was also considered as a potential Conservative Parliamentary candidate in the 1902 Clitheroe by-election. He was appointed a Companion of the Order of the Bath (CB), served as a Justice of the Peace and was also Deputy Lieutenant of Lancashire and High Sheriff of Yorkshire (1913–14).

Parker was elected a Fellow of the Society of Antiquaries and Royal Historical Society and was involved in various societies. He was President of the Harleian Society, Yorkshire Archaeological Society, and Yorkshire Parish Register Society. In Lancashire, he was Member of Council (from 1916) and President (1925–38) of the Chetham Society, President (1928–33) and vice-president (1933–37) of the Lancashire and Cheshire Antiquarian Society, Member of Council (from 1893) and vice-president of the Record Society of Lancashire and Cheshire, and Member of Council (from 1899) and President of the Lancashire Parish Register Society (1920–38). He published several volumes of medieval records. Parker died on 24 February 1938.

Family 
On 11 April 1896, Parker married his first cousin, Gertrude Marion Beatrice Burn-Murdoch (1865–1927), a daughter of Reverend Canon James McGibbon Burn-Murdoch and Maria Hannah Carr (a descendant of John Carr (1723–1807)). Beatrice Parker died on 12 September 1927. Their only son was Robert Goulbourne Parker (1900–75).

Select bibliography 
 A Calendar of the Lancashire Assize Rolls, Record Society of Lancashire and Cheshire, 47 (1904), 49 (1905)
 The Parish Register of Thirsk in the County of York, North Riding, 1556–1721, Yorkshire Parish Register Society, 42 (1911)
 Feet of Fines for the County of York, 1218–31, Yorkshire Archaeological Aociety, 62 (1921)
 Plea Rolls of the County Palatine of Lancaster: Roll I, Chetham Society, New Series, 87 (1928)
 Lancashire Deeds, Volume I: Shuttleworth Deeds, Part 1, Chetham Society, New Series, 91 (1934)
 The Registers of the Parish Church of Whalley in the County of Lancaster, 1605–53, Lancashire Parish Register Society, 74 (1936)

External links 
 Portrait of Colonel J. W. R. Parker CB FSA by Edward Matthew Hale (1852–1924) on the Art UK Website

References

1857 births
1938 deaths
British Army personnel of the Second Boer War
British antiquarians
East Lancashire Regiment officers
High Sheriffs of Yorkshire
Deputy Lieutenants of Lancashire
English justices of the peace
Companions of the Order of the Bath
Fellows of the Society of Antiquaries of London
Fellows of the Royal Historical Society
19th-century English writers
19th-century English historians
20th-century English historians
John William
Victorian writers
English antiquarians
Antiquarians
History of Lancashire
Record Society of Lancashire and Cheshire
Lancashire and Cheshire Antiquarian Society
Chetham Society
Lancashire Parish Register Society